Mickey Mouse (originally known as Mickey Mouse Sound Cartoons) is a series of American animated comedy short films produced by Walt Disney Productions. The series started in 1928 with Plane Crazy and ended in 1953 with The Simple Things. Four additional shorts were released between 1983 and 2013. The series is notable for its innovation with sound synchronization and character animation, and also introduced well-known characters such as Mickey Mouse, Minnie Mouse, Pluto and Goofy.

The name "Mickey Mouse" was first used in the films' title sequences to refer specifically to the character, but was used from 1935 to 1953 to refer to the series itself as in "Walt Disney presents a Mickey Mouse." In this sense "a Mickey Mouse" was a shortened form of "a Mickey Mouse sound cartoon" which was used in the earliest films. Films from 1929 to 1935 which were re-released during this time also used this naming convention, but it was not used for the three shorts released between 1983 and 1995 (Mickey's Christmas Carol, The Prince and the Pauper, and Runaway Brain). Mickey's name was also used occasionally to market other films which were formally part of other series. Examples of this include several Silly Symphonies and Goofy and Wilbur (1939).

Production
Disney began secretly producing the first Mickey Mouse films while still contractually required to finish some Oswald the Lucky Rabbit cartoons for producer Charles Mintz. The first two films, Plane Crazy and The Gallopin' Gaucho, were previewed in theaters but failed to pick up a distributor for a broad release. For the third film, Disney added synchronized sound, a technology that was still in its early stages at the time. Steamboat Willie debuted in New York in November 1928 and was an instant success. The revenues from the film provided the studio with much needed resources, and the studio quickly began to produce new cartoons as well as releasing sound versions of the first two.

Production slowed towards the end of the 1930s as the studio began to focus on other characters and feature-length films. The series was informally retired in 1953 with the release of The Simple Things, but was revived in 1983 and 1990 with two featurettes, or three reel short films. 1995's Runaway Brain returned the series to its single reel format, while the most recent installment, 2013's Get a Horse!, was produced in the black-and-white style of the early films.

The cartoons were directed by 20 different people. Those with the most credits include Burt Gillett (34), Wilfred Jackson (18), Walt Disney (16), David Hand (15), and Ben Sharpsteen (14); the director of the most recent installment, Lauren MacMullan, was the first female director. Notable animators who worked on the series include Ub Iwerks, Norm Ferguson, Ollie Johnston, Frank Thomas, and Fred Moore. Mickey's voice is mostly provided by Walt Disney, with some additional work by Carl Stalling and Clarence Nash. By 1948, Jimmy MacDonald had taken over Mickey's voice. Wayne Allwine voiced the mouse in the three films released from 1983 to 1995. In the most recent film, Get a Horse!, Mickey's dialogue was compiled from archival recordings primarily of Walt Disney's voice work.

List of films
The following is a list of Mickey Mouse films. The early films released by Celebrity Productions (1928–1929) and Columbia Pictures (1930–1932) were distributed by region and state, so there is no definitive release date. The dates used in the list from 1928 to mid-1932 are shipping dates, reflecting when the Disney studio shipped the completed films to the distributors, per the 2018 Disney Enterprises book Mickey Mouse: The Ultimate History. The shorts released by United Artists (1932–1937) and RKO Radio (1937–1940) have official release dates announced by the distributors.

Gray headers indicate black-and-white films, while yellow headers indicate color films.

1928

1929
{| class="wikitable sortable" width="100%"
! width="10%"|Installment
! width="30%"|Film
! width="30%"|Director
! width="30%"|Release date
|-
| style="background-color: #D3D3D3" | 
| style="background-color: #D3D3D3" | 
| style="background-color: #D3D3D3" | 
| style="background-color: #D3D3D3" | 
|- class="expand-child" style="border-bottom: 3px solid #2F4F4F;"
| colspan="4" |

Mickey wants to take Minnie to a dance, but Pete's flashy car beats Mickey's horse-drawn wagon as her transportation of choice. At the dance, Mickey uses a balloon to make himself light on his feet—the perfect dancing partner—but this doesn't keep Minnie at his side for long, either.

Other appearances: Minnie Mouse, Pete

Notes: A colorized version was made in the late 1980s.
|-
| style="background-color: #D3D3D3" | 
| style="background-color: #D3D3D3" | 
| style="background-color: #D3D3D3" | 
| style="background-color: #D3D3D3" | 
|- class="expand-child" style="border-bottom: 3px solid #2F4F4F;"
| colspan="4" |

Mickey tries to emulate his hero, Charles Lindbergh, and woo Minnie by building and flying his own airplane.

Other appearances: Minnie Mouse, Clarabelle Cow

Notes: This is the first film to be animated; silent version previewed May 15, 1928, generally released on March 17, 1929.
|-
| style="background-color: #D3D3D3" | 
| style="background-color: #D3D3D3" | 
| style="background-color: #D3D3D3" | 
| style="background-color: #D3D3D3" | 
|- class="expand-child" style="border-bottom: 3px solid #2F4F4F;"
| colspan="4" |

Mickey owns and performs at his own theatre, going in drag as a harem girl, in a derby as a Hasidic Jew, and finally in a wig as a fancy pianist.

Other appearances: Minnie Mouse, Kat Nipp

Notes: This is the first time Mickey wears gloves.
|-
| style="background-color: #D3D3D3" | 
| style="background-color: #D3D3D3" | 
| style="background-color: #D3D3D3" | 
| style="background-color: #D3D3D3" | 
|- class="expand-child" style="border-bottom: 3px solid #2F4F4F;"
| colspan="4" |

While Tom Cat, drunk on bootlegged hooch, is away hunting, Mickey, Minnie, and an army of mice ransack the feline's home for food.

Other appearances: Minnie Mouse, Kat Nipp as "Tom Cat"

Notes: Remake of Alice Comedies film Alice Rattled by Rats, depicts Mickey and Minnie as regular mice
|-
| style="background-color: #D3D3D3" | 
| style="background-color: #D3D3D3" | 
| style="background-color: #D3D3D3" | 
| style="background-color: #D3D3D3" | 
|- class="expand-child" style="border-bottom: 3px solid #2F4F4F;"
| colspan="4" |

Mickey joins an army of mice dressed like the forces of the Confederate States of America to battle an army of cats dressed in German World War 1 helmets. Kommandant Pete leads the cats in a raid on Mickey's farm. Mickey mounts a spirited defense of the farmhouse.

Other appearances: Pete
|-
| style="background-color: #D3D3D3" | 
| style="background-color: #D3D3D3" | 
| style="background-color: #D3D3D3" | 
| style="background-color: #D3D3D3" | 
|- class="expand-child" style="border-bottom: 3px solid #2F4F4F;"
| colspan="4" |
Mickey flirts with Minnie on the farm, but she spurns him—making him look bad in the eyes of his helper, Horace Horsecollar.

Other appearances: Minnie Mouse, Horace Horsecollar, Clarabelle Cow
|-
| style="background-color: #D3D3D3" |
| style="background-color: #D3D3D3" |
| style="background-color: #D3D3D3" |
| style="background-color: #D3D3D3" |
|- class="expand-child" style="border-bottom: 3px solid #2F4F4F;"
| colspan="4" |

Mickey sells animated hot dogs at a carnival and heckles rival barker Kat Nipp. Also at the fair is Minnie who performs as a shimmy dancer. Mickey gives here a free hot dog and, with the help of two alley cats, serenades Minnie outside her trailer.

Other appearances: Minnie Mouse, Clarabelle Cow, Kat Nipp

Notes: This is the first time Mickey speaks and the first time Mickey has pie eyes and eyebrows.
|-
| style="background-color: #D3D3D3" | 
| style="background-color: #D3D3D3" | 
| style="background-color: #D3D3D3" | 
| style="background-color: #D3D3D3" | 
|- class="expand-child" style="border-bottom: 3px solid #2F4F4F;"
| colspan="4" |

Mickey and his barnyard pals put on a show that includes dancing ducks, opera singing by Patricia Pig, and Mickey's own rendition of his theme song, "Minnie's Yoo Hoo."

Other appearances: Minnie Mouse, Clarabelle Cow, Patricia Pig

Notes: Introduction of "Minnie's Yoo Hoo", Mickey's theme song
|-
| style="background-color: #D3D3D3" | 
| style="background-color: #D3D3D3" | 
| style="background-color: #D3D3D3" | 
| style="background-color: #D3D3D3" | 
|- class="expand-child" style="border-bottom: 3px solid #2F4F4F;"
| colspan="4" |
Mickey's running a small-town railroad. He takes Minnie for a wild ride on a humanized train which eventually rumbles out of control.

Other appearances: Minnie Mouse, Clarabelle Cow

Notes: A colorized version was made in 1991.
|-
| style="background-color: #D3D3D3" | 
| style="background-color: #D3D3D3" | 
| style="background-color: #D3D3D3" | 
| style="background-color: #D3D3D3" | 
|- class="expand-child" style="border-bottom: 3px solid #2F4F4F;"
| colspan="4" |

As part of "Mickey's Big Road Show", Mickey plays a calliope pulled by Horace. They later play the xylophone and piano.

Other appearances: Horace Horsecollar
|-
| style="background-color: #D3D3D3" | 
| style="background-color: #D3D3D3" | 
| style="background-color: #D3D3D3" | 
| style="background-color: #D3D3D3" | 
|- class="expand-child" style="border-bottom: 3px solid #2F4F4F;"
| colspan="4" |
Mickey goes on a hunting expedition to the jungle, but when his rifle malfunctions Mickey is left facing several angry and vicious animals. To appease them, Mickey starts playing music, and soon has all of the animals joining him.
|-
| style="background-color: #D3D3D3" |
| style="background-color: #D3D3D3" |
| style="background-color: #D3D3D3" |{{center|Jack King{{efn|While many sources credit Walt Disney as the director, the animators' draft lists King as director instead.<ref>{{cite book |editor1-last=Gerstein |editor1-first=David |editor2-last=Groth |editor2-first=Gary |title=Walt Disney's Mickey Mouse: Race to Death Valley |publisher=Fantagraphics Books }}</ref>}}}}
| style="background-color: #D3D3D3" |
|- class="expand-child" style="border-bottom: 3px solid #2F4F4F;"
| colspan="4" |
Mickey weathers a ferocious storm inside an old haunted house where he is compelled to play the organ for a group of ghouls.

Other appearances: Skeletons

Notes: Title shorted to Haunted House in rerelease title sequence.
|-
| style="background-color: #D3D3D3" |
| style="background-color: #D3D3D3" |
| style="background-color: #D3D3D3" |
| style="background-color: #D3D3D3" |
|- class="expand-child" style="border-bottom: 3px solid #2F4F4F;"
| colspan="4" |

Mickey works as a beach lifeguard who saves Minnie from being drowned by a wave. After Minnie is rescued, she fusses, Mickey tries to cheer her up by dancing, playing music and scat sings to "Rocked in the Cradle of the Deep". Also present are a wide variety of sea birds and marine mammals who accompany Mickey.

Other appearances: Minnie Mouse

Notes: Last film released by Celebrity Productions. Also the last film in the series that was animated by Iwerks.
|-
|}

1930

1931

1932

1933

1934

1935

1936

1937

1938

1939

1940

1941

1942

1943

1946

1947

1948

1951

1952

1953

1983

1990

1995

2013

Releases
Every Mickey Mouse cartoon was originally released theatrically, typically appearing before feature films. In 1929, some theaters began to host the "Mickey Mouse Club", a children's program which would exclusively show Mickey's cartoons. The series was distributed by Columbia Pictures (1930–1932), United Artists (1932–1937), and RKO Radio Pictures (1937–1953). The four most recent films were released by Disney's own company, Walt Disney Studios Motion Pictures (formerly known as Buena Vista Pictures Distribution).

Many of the films were also broadcast on television, beginning in 1936 on BBC Television. Here the series was shown on a regular basis except during World War II. In the United States, selected films were shown on the Walt Disney anthology television series, and later on other series such as The Mouse Factory (1971–1973), Mickey's Mouse Tracks (1992–1995), and Ink & Paint Club (1997–1998).

Home media
The films have also been released in various forms of home media. In the 1960s there were several 8 mm and Super 8 releases, although these were often silent, black-and-white, or condensed versions. In 1978, Disney began to release selected films on VHS, laserdisc, and later DVD. Starting in 2010, some of the cartoons were made available on the iTunes Store as digital downloads.

Disney has also released films online. At the Disney website, cartoons are shown on a rotating basis under the video page "Mickey & Friends". On Walt Disney Animation Studios' official YouTube channel, three complete cartoons have been released: Plane Crazy (1928), Steamboat Willie (1928), and Hawaiian Holiday (1937), and most of Thru the Mirror (1936) as seen on the Disneyland episode "The Plausible Impossible" (1956).

As of 2018, the only complete re-release of the entire series has been in the "Walt Disney Treasures" DVD sets. The vast majority of the series appears between four two-disc sets: "Mickey Mouse in Black and White" (2002), "Mickey Mouse in Black and White, Volume Two" (2004), "Mickey Mouse in Living Color" (2001), and "Mickey Mouse in Living Color, Volume Two" (2004). Film critic Leonard Maltin, who hosts the collection, implied that there was opposition to releasing the complete series because of some content now considered politically incorrect, such as racial and ethnic stereotypes. Maltin argued that releasing the material uncensored was the only way to "learn from the past". The only film not included in this collection was the subsequently released Get a Horse! (2013) which first premiered at the Annecy International Animated Film Festival and was shown ahead of Frozen.

See also
List of Walt Disney Animation Studios short filmsAlice ComediesSilly SymphonyList of Mickey Mouse films and appearances
Donald Duck (film series)Mickey Mouse Works''
Mickey Mouse (TV series)

Notes

References

Bibliography

The Encyclopedia of Disney Animated Shorts (EDAS)

The Internet Movie Database (IMDb)

Tomart's Illustrated Disneyana Catalog and Price Guide

External links
"Mickey Mouse" at The Encyclopedia Of Disney Animated Shorts
"Mickey Mouse Theatrical Cartoon List" at the Big Cartoon DataBase
"Synopsis for the Mickey Mouse" at the Big Cartoon Database

Film series introduced in 1928
Animated film series
Children's film series
Lists of animated films by character

Walt Disney Studios (division) franchises
Disney-related lists
American comedy short films
Slapstick comedy